Demsey McKean (born 25 September 1990) is an Australian professional boxer, a former mixed martial arts fighter and former Muay Thai fighter.

McKean's first major title bout in his career saw him defeat Australian boxer Willie Nasio for the Australian National heavyweight title. McKean won the bout by TKO. His first introduction into the rankings came after defeating Patrick Eneanya and Jonathan Rice. McKean has also been a sparring partner to two time unified world heavyweight champion, Anthony Joshua and interim WBC World heavyweight champion, Dillian Whyte.

Early life 
From the age of six, McKean played Rugby union and Rugby League. He fell in love with combat sports when he first watched UFC at the age of 19. Shortly after he joined an MMA gym and had his first MMA fight 8 months after joining. For a couple of years McKean fought in both MMA and Muay Thai with only one defeat in all combat sports.

Boxing

Professional boxing debut to tournament winner (2014 – 2016) 
McKean made his professional boxing debut on 31 October 2014 against Luke Barclay on the Alex Leapai vs Malik Scott undercard at Logan Metro Sports Centre, Crestmead, Queensland, Australia. Prior to this fight, McKean had no amateur or corporate boxing experience. McKean won the fight by unanimous decision with him winning all four rounds. McKean fought three times in 2015, all under his new promoter Angelo Di Carlo. McKean won all three fights.

In March 2016, McKean fought Anthony Fowler for the second time, but this time for the Queensland State heavyweight title. McKean won the fight by knockout, securing his first boxing title of his career. In April 2016, McKean took part in the annual eight man tournament, The Frank Bianco Cup. As well as McKean, the participants included UFC fighter Tai Tuivasa, Ben Sosoli, New Zealander David Tuitupou, New Zealander Elijah Tevaga Sa'lesui, James Cook, Steven Parima, Rhys Sullivan and Hamad Alloush. McKean stopped James Cook in the 3rd round in the quarter finals, won by unanimous decision against Elijah Tevaga Sa'lesui in the semi finals and won by unanimous decision against UFC Fighter Tai Tuivasa in the finals to win the $15,000 and the Frank Bianco Cup. McKean finished up his 2016 with a unanimous decision win against Hunter Sam.

Becoming National Champion (2017) 
In March 2017, McKean fought in a rematch against Hunter Sam for the Interim Australian national heavyweight title. At the time the full champion was New Zealand born Will Nasio who was not able to compete. Hunter Sam is a former Australian Champion himself. During the fight Hunter Sam was deducted a point in the first and seventh round for illegal low blows landed against McKean. McKean won the fight by stopping his opponent in the tenth and final round. In July 2017, McKean called out the full Australian National Champion Will Nasio which was televised on TV. In the video McKean says Will Nasio has pulled out of three contracts in the past with this being McKean's fourth call out. The call out worked as the fight was set to happen in October 2017. McKean won the fight by stoppage in the sixth round making McKean the undisputed Australian national heavyweight champion.

2018 – 2019 
Due to injury that was caused in the Will Nasio fight, McKean had to take a year off from boxing due to ligament replacement in his left knuckle. Due to the injury, McKean had to turn down a lot of major international boxing fights including some in Canada for the Commonwealth title. In late 2018, McKean began to fight more international opponents with the first opponent being the Russian born Australian boxer and former IBO World title contender Victor Oganov. McKean won the fight by sixth round stoppage. McKean finished his 2018 with a fight against Nigerian born Australian and former IBF Pan Pacific champion Roger Izonritei. This is also the first Australian national title defence for McKean since winning the title the year prior. McKean won the fight by corner retirement with McKean successfully defending his Australian title.

In March 2019, McKean made his in ring return. Originally he was scheduled to fight Brazilian Robson Bambu, however, due to visa issues he was replaced by Brazilian boxer and former WBO Latino champion Marcelo Luiz Nascimento. McKean won the fight by stoppage in the second round. McKean was originally booked to take on Solomon Haumono on 8 June 2019, however, Solomon Haumono withdrew from the fight. American Curtis Harper was originally going to be the replacement however Curtis Harper also withdrew. In the end McKean fought Czech Republic boxer Dominik Musil. McKean won the fight by knockout in the second round.

In September 2019, McKean was booked to fight for major regional title against Nigerian born Australian Patrick Eneanya for the vacant WBO African heavyweight title. The fight was in jeopardy when McKean was hospitalized the day of the fight. McKean did admit that he wasn't eating right indulging in junk food. However he was healthy enough to compete that day which led to him winning by sixth round stoppage, winning the WBO African title. A month after the fight, McKean got his first taste of rankings, receiving the WBO ranking in October 2019 and being ranked 14th. McKean finished his 2019 with a fight against Northern Ireland born Australian Scott Belshaw. McKean won the fight by third-round knockout.

World rankings (2020) 
Throughout the end of 2019, negotiations were happening to have Demsey McKean fight former WBA World Heavyweight Champion Lucas Browne. Lucas Browne agreed with McKean promoter Angelo Di Carlo for a March 2020 fight. Unfortunately in December 2019 it was announced that Lucas Browne withdrew from the fight. Instead of taking on Lucas Browne, McKean took on American boxer Jonathan Rice in the biggest fight of his career for two major regional titles, the WBO Asia Pacific heavyweight title and IBF Intercontinental heavyweight title. McKean said he started eating better and training better leading into this fight. Jonathan Rice spoke a lot of trash talk in their upcoming fight, but McKean didn't care for it. McKean won the fight by tenth round stoppage in the last 20 seconds of the fight with McKean winning the WBO Asia Pacific and IBF Intercontinental heavyweight titles.

Due to COVID-19 pandemic in Australia and across the world, less events were happening across the world which made boxers less active including McKean. McKean wouldn't be back in the ring until May 2021. In May 2020, McKean called out Joseph Parker to take him on in his next fight. McKean obviously backing himself, believes that being southpaw would give him the advantage over Parker. In July 2020, McKean continued to call out Joseph Parker but has no intentions to disrespect Joseph Parker. In October 2020, McKean expressed his interest in fighting Efe Ajagba, a boxer who fought and defeated Jonathan Rice as well. McKean was also interested in the winner of the Joseph Parker vs. Junior Fa fight. McKean also showed interest in fighting Tyson Fury. McKean was scheduled to fight again in December 2020  defending his regional titles against Bowie Tupou on the Tim Tszyu vs Bowyn Morgan undercard. However, not only did Bowie Tupou pull out, Tupou's replacement pulled out as well, leading to McKean fight being cut completely from the card.

2021 
In May 2021, McKean made his in ring return against unbeaten New Zealand born Samoan boxer Kiki Toa Leutele. McKean won the fight by Unanimous Decision. After the fight Kiki Toa Leutele called out for a rematch, with the belief that he hurt McKean more than McKean hurt him. In June 2021, McKean was being considered and in talks for a possible IBF World title eliminator fight against Filip Hrgović where the winner of the fight would face the winner of Anthony Joshua vs Oleksandr Usyk. In August 2021, McKean was offered sparring with Anthony Joshua in the UK. Not only did McKean accept the offer, he also relocated to the UK in the hope of getting more active, especially with the Covid pandemic and less activity in Australia. In September 2021, McKean called out Joseph Parker again stating "That's what everyone wants to see".

Professional boxing titles 
Australian Queensland State
Australia – Queensland State heavyweight title
Frank Bianco Cup 
2016 Eight man heavyweight tournament winner
Australian National Boxing Federation
Interim Australian National heavyweight title
Australian National heavyweight title
World Boxing Organisation
African heavyweight title
Asia Pacific heavyweight title
International Boxing Federation
Inter-Continental heavyweight title

Professional boxing record

Professional MMA record 

|-
|Win
|2–1
| Peter Klaricich
|Submission (armbar)
|FWC 7 - FightWorld Cup 7
|
|align=center|2
|align=center|2:54
|Nerang Police Citizens Youth Club, Nerang, Queensland, Australia
|
|-
|Lose
|1–1
| Semir Celikovic
|Submission (rear-naked choke)
|FWC 6 - To The Winner Go The Spoils
|
|align=center|1
|align=center|1:44
|Nerang Police Citizens Youth Club, Nerang, Queensland, Australia
|
|-
|Win
|1–0
| Josh Hansson
|Decision (majority)
|FWC 5 - Call to Arms
|
|align=center|3
|align=center|3:00
|Nerang Police Citizens Youth Club, Nerang, Queensland, Australia
|
|}

References

External links

Living people
Sportspeople from Ipswich, Queensland
Sportspeople from the Gold Coast, Queensland
Mixed martial artists from the Gold Coast
Heavyweight boxers
Heavyweight mixed martial artists
Mixed martial artists utilizing boxing
Australian male boxers
Australian male mixed martial artists
Sportsmen from Queensland
1990 births